UFC 137: Penn vs. Diaz was a mixed martial arts (MMA) pay-per-view event held by the Ultimate Fighting Championship on October 29, 2011, at Mandalay Bay Events Center in Las Vegas, Nevada.

Background
The event was originally expected to take place on October 15, 2011, at the Echo Arena Liverpool in Liverpool, England.  However, due to multiple scheduling issues with broadcast rights, the organization cancelled those plans. UFC 137 featured two preliminary fights live on Spike TV.

Dennis Siver was expected to face Sam Stout at this event, but Stout withdrew from the bout on August 29 and was replaced by Donald Cerrone.

Nick Diaz, was originally scheduled to headline the card opposite Georges St-Pierre for the UFC Welterweight Championship, but promoters canceled his appearance in the fight on September 7, because he failed to make media appearances. Carlos Condit was promoted from his fight with B.J. Penn to replace Diaz and face St-Pierre.

On September 8, B.J. Penn announced via Twitter that Dana White offered him a fight he "cannot refuse" and will still be fighting at UFC 137. Later that day, both Penn and White announced that the fight would be against Nick Diaz.

On October 1, it was revealed that Tim Credeur was forced out of his bout with Brad Tavares for unknown reasons. Promotional newcomer Dustin Jacoby stepped-in to face Tavares. On October 21, Tavares withdrew from bout due to an injury and was replaced by undefeated newcomer Clifford Starks.

Georges St-Pierre was expected to defend his title against Carlos Condit on this card. St-Pierre withdrew due to a knee injury and Nick Diaz vs. B.J. Penn became the main event.

During the official UFC 137 weigh ins, Tyson Griffin failed to make the featherweight limit. Griffin was three pounds over and was fined 25 percent of his earnings causing the bout to take place at a catchweight of 148 lb.

Results

Bonus awards
Fighters received $75,000 bonuses.

 Fight of the Night: B.J. Penn vs. Nick Diaz
 Knockout of the Night: Bart Palaszewski 
 Submission of the Night: Donald Cerrone

Reported payout
The following is the reported payout to the fighters as reported to the Nevada State Athletic Commission. It does not include sponsor money and also does not include the UFC's traditional "fight night" bonuses.

Nick Diaz: $200,000 (no win bonus) def. BJ Penn: $150,000
Cheick Kongo: $140,000 ($70,000 win bonus) def. Matt Mitrione: $10,000
Roy Nelson: $40,000 ($20,000 win bonus) def. Mirko Cro Cop: $75,000
Scott Jorgensen: $33,000 ($16,500 win bonus) def. Jeff Curran: $8,000
Hatsu Hioki: $30,000 ($15,000 win bonus) def. George Roop: $8,000
Donald Cerrone: $54,000 ($27,000 win bonus) def. Dennis Siver: $27,000
Bart Palaszewski: $28,500 ($10,000 win bonus) def. Tyson Griffin: $25,500 ^
Brandon Vera: $120,000 ($60,000 win bonus) def. Eliot Marshall: $15,000
Ramsey Nijem: $20,000 ($10,000 win bonus) def. Danny Downes: $5,000
Francis Carmont: $12,000 ($6,000 win bonus) def. Chris Camozzi: $8,000
Clifford Starks: $12,000 ($6,000 win bonus) def. Dustin Jacoby: $6,000

^Although not recognized on the official pay sheet, Griffin was fined $8,500, or 25% of his base pay for missing weight for the fight, and contracts were reworked with those amounts. That money was issued to Palaszewski, an NSAC official confirmed.

See also
List of UFC events

References

External links

Ultimate Fighting Championship events
2011 in mixed martial arts
Mixed martial arts in Las Vegas
2011 in sports in Nevada